Yitzhak Kaduri, also spelled Kadouri, Kadourie, Kedourie; "Yitzhak" ( – 28 January 2006), was a renowned Mizrahi Haredi rabbi and kabbalist who devoted his life to Torah study and prayer on behalf of the Jewish people. He taught and practiced the kavanot of the Rashash. His blessings and amulets were also widely sought to cure people of illnesses and infertility. In his life, he published no religious articles or books. At the time of his death, estimates of his age ranged from 103 to 108, and his birth year is still disputed.

His funeral, which was held in Jerusalem drew over half a million followers in what was described as the largest funeral in Israel's history.

Early life
Kaduri was born in Baghdad, which was then part of the Ottoman Empire. His father, Rabbi Kadhuri Diba ben Aziza, was a spice trader. As a youngster, Kaduri excelled in his studies and began learning Kabbalah while still in his teens. He was a child student of Rabbi Yosef Hayyim and studied at the Zilka Yeshivah in Baghdad. He moved to the British Mandate of Palestine in 1923 and there changed his name from Diba to Kaduri.

Student of Kabbalah
He went to study at the Shoshanim LeDavid Yeshiva for kabbalists from Iraq. There he learned from the leading kabbalists of the time, including Rabbi Yehuda Ftaya, author of Beit Lechem Yehudah, and Rabbi Yaakov Chaim Sofer, author of Kaf Hachaim. He later immersed himself in regular Talmudic study and rabbinical law in the Porat Yosef Yeshiva in Jerusalem's Old City, where he also studied Kabbalah with the Rosh Yeshivah, Rabbi Ezra Attiya, Rabbi Saliman Eliyahu (father of Sephardic Chief Rabbi Mordechai Eliyahu), and other learned rabbis.

In 1934, Rabbi Kaduri and his family moved to the Old City, where the Porat Yosef Yeshivah gave him an apartment nearby with a job of binding the yeshivah's books and copying over rare manuscripts in the yeshivah's library. The books remained in the yeshivah's library, while the copies of manuscripts were stored in Rabbi Kaduri's personal library. Before binding each book, he would study it intently, committing it to memory. He was reputed to have photographic memory and also mastered the Talmud by heart, including the adjoining Rashi and Tosafot commentaries.

During the period of Arab-Israeli friction that led up to the 1948 Arab–Israeli War, the Porat Yosef Yeshivah was virtually turned into a fortress against frequent flashes of violence. When the Jewish quarter of the Old City fell to the invading Jordanian Army, the Jordanians set fire to the yeshivah and all surrounding houses, destroying all the books and manuscripts that Rabbi Kaduri could not smuggle to Beit El Yeshiva (Yeshivat HaMekubalim) in Jerusalem. He knew all the writings of Rabbi Yitzhak Luria, the founder of modern Kabbalah by heart. After the passing of the leading kabbalist, Rabbi Efraim Hakohen, in 1989, the remaining kabbalists appointed Rabbi Kaduri as their head.

Rabbi Kaduri did not publish any of the works that he authored on Kabbalah; he allowed only students of Kabbalah to study them. He did publish some articles criticizing those who engage in "practical Kabbalah", the popular dissemination of advice or amulets, often for a price. Kadouri said "It is forbidden to teach a non-Jew Kabbalah, not even Talmud, not even simple Torah;" perhaps referring to pop celebrity Madonna's publicised interest in Kabbalah; he also said that women (even Jewish) are not allowed to study Kabbalah.

Blessings, amulets and prophecies

Over the years, thousands of people (mainly but not exclusively Sephardi Jews) would come to seek his advice, blessings and amulets which he would create specifically for the individual in need. He had learned the Kabbalistic secrets of the amulets from his teacher, Rabbi Yehuda Fatiyah. Many people directly attributed personal miracles to receiving a blessing from Rabbi Kaduri, such as recovery from severe illnesses and diseases, children born to couples with fertility problems, finding a spouse, and economic blessings.

His rise to fame, though, began when his son, Rabbi David Kaduri, who ran a poultry store in the Bukharim Market, decided to found a proper yeshivah organization under his father. Called Nachalat Yitzchak yeshiva, it was located adjacent to the family home in the Bukharim neighbourhood of Jerusalem. His grandson, Yossi Kaduri, took part in this endeavour with him. 

Kaduri's followers believed that he was able to predict events. In late 2004, Kaduri said "Great tragedies in the world are foreseen" two weeks before the 2004 Indian Ocean earthquake and tsunami; reporter Baruch Gordon of Arutz Sheva connected the two by saying Kaduri "predicted" the tragedy.

Political involvement

The last two decades of his life were marred by the controversial way that some would use him to promote various political parties during Israeli elections. Rabbi Kaduri achieved celebrity status during the 1996 Knesset elections when he was flown by helicopter to multiple political rallies in support of the Shas party, and for amulets that were produced in his name for supporters of that party.

In October 1997, Benjamin Netanyahu, then in his first term as Prime Minister of Israel, came to visit Kaduri at his synagogue and was recorded as whispering in his ear "the left has forgotten what it is to be a Jew". This was considered as a divisive action and resonated in the press.

Final days and death
Kaduri lived a life of poverty and simplicity. He ate little, spoke little, and prayed each month at the gravesites of tzaddikim in Israel. His first wife, Rabbanit Sara, died in 1989. He remarried in 1993 to Rabbanit Dorit, a baalat teshuva just over half his age.

In January 2006, Rabbi Kaduri was hospitalized with pneumonia in the Bikur Holim Hospital in Jerusalem. He died at around 10 p.m. January 28, 2006 (29 Tevet 5766). He was alert and lucid until his last day.

An estimated 500,000 people took part in his funeral procession on January 29, which started from the Nachalat Yitzchak Yeshivah and wound its way through the streets of Jerusalem to the Givat Shaul cemetery (also known as Har HaMenuchot) near the entrance to the city of Jerusalem.

Mashiach

Before his death, Kaduri had said that he expected the Mashiach, the Jewish Messiah, to arrive soon, and that he had met him a year earlier. It has been alleged that he left a hand-written note to his followers and they were reportedly instructed to only open the note after Rabbi Kaduri had been dead for one year. After this time period had passed, the note was opened by these followers and was found to read, "" (Yarim ha-am veyokhiakh shedvaro vetorato omdim; translated as "he will raise the people and confirm that his word and law are standing"), which, by taking the first letter of each word, reads , "Yehoshua". Such acrostics are a well recognised phenomenon in the Tanakh. 

Many religious Jews and counter missionaries discredit the note as a Messianic Jewish forgery. 

The disciples and son of Rav Kaduri has testified in a video that there was never such a note, and the whole story is a forgery.

Rabbi Tovia Singer suggests that when considering the context of the note, the name Yehoshua may refer to the biblical Yehoshua Ben Nun, rather than to Jesus Christ whose original Hebrew name is the shortened version of Yehoshua—Yeshua. "Yehoshua" in the original Greek Septuagint and New Testament is also directly transliterated as 'Jesus'. Singer also claimed that no member of Kaduri's family he spoke to 'knew anything about this note', but it is Kaduri's disciples who publicized the note and posted it on Kaduri's website.

References

External links

 Video of Kaduri visit in summer 2000 to Bet El 
 Obituary in the Jerusalem Post

Year of birth uncertain
2006 deaths
People from Baghdad
Iraqi Jews
Iraqi emigrants to Mandatory Palestine
20th-century rabbis in Jerusalem
Israeli centenarians
Sephardic Haredi rabbis in Israel
Kabbalists
Haredi rabbis in Mandatory Palestine
Burials at Har HaMenuchot
Deaths from pneumonia in Israel
Men centenarians